The Palazzo della Pilotta is a complex of edifices located between Piazzale della Pace and the Lungoparma in the historical centre of Parma, region of Emilia Romagna, Italy. Its name derives from the game of pelota played at one time by Spanish soldiers stationed in Parma.

History
Built around 1583, during the last years of reign of Duke Ottavio Farnese, it developed around the corridor (Corridore) which connected the keep (Rocchetta, traces of which can be seen next the river Parma) to the Ducal Palace: the latter, begun in 1622 under Duke Ranuccio I, was never completed. the façade on the Piazza della Ghiaia is missing and the annexed Dominican church of St. Peter was demolished only in recent times.

The existing complex includes three courts: the Cortile di San Pietro Martire (now best known as Cortile della Pilotta), Cortile del Guazzatoio (originally della pelota) and the Cortile della Racchetta. The Pilotta was to house a large hall, later turned into the Teatro Farnese, the stables and the grooms' residences, the Academy Hall and other rooms.

After the end of the Farnese family rule of Parma, much of the movable assets of the palace were removed by then Duke Charles I, later King of Spain, and taken to Naples in the 1730s. The Biblioteca Palatina was established here by 1769. Elizabeth Farnese, Queen of Spain, was born here in 1692.

By 2015, the building spaces had been taken up by a number of cultural institutions and museums, including
in addition to the library:
 National Archaeological Museum
 Liceo artistico statale Paolo Toschi (it), an art school named after Paolo Toschi
 Museo Bodoniano (it), a museum dedicated to Giambattista Bodoni
 Teatro Farnese 
 Galleria Nazionale di Parma

See also
 Ball of wind
 Valencian pilota

References

External links
 Amici della Pilotta friends' association

Houses completed in 1583
Buildings and structures in Parma
Pilotta
Museums in Parma
National museums of Italy
Farnese residences
Duchy of Parma